Sea Girt School District is a community public school district that serves students in pre-kindergarten through eighth grade from Sea Girt, in Monmouth County, New Jersey, United States.

As of the 2018–19 school year, the district, comprised of one school, had an enrollment of 125 students and 16.9 classroom teachers (on an FTE basis), for a student–teacher ratio of 7.4:1. In the 2016–17 school year, Sea Girt had the 21st smallest enrollment of any school district in the state, with 145 students.

The district is classified by the New Jersey Department of Education as being in District Factor Group "I", the second-highest of eight groupings. District Factor Groups organize districts statewide to allow comparison by common socioeconomic characteristics of the local districts. From lowest socioeconomic status to highest, the categories are A, B, CD, DE, FG, GH, I and J.

For ninth through twelfth grades, Sea Girt's public school students attend Manasquan High School, as part of a sending/receiving relationship with the Manasquan Public Schools. Manasquan High School also serves students from Avon-by-the-Sea, Belmar, Brielle, Lake Como, Spring Lake, Spring Lake Heights who attend Manasquan High School as part of sending/receiving relationships with their respective districts. As of the 2018–19 school year, the high school had an enrollment of 969 students and 72.9 classroom teachers (on an FTE basis), for a student–teacher ratio of 13.3:1.

Awards and recognition
For the 2005-06 and 2017-18 school years, Sea Girt Elementary School was one of the select schools in New Jersey recognized by the United States Department of Education as a recipient of the National Blue Ribbon Schools Program, the highest official level of recognition that an American school can receive. The school was one of nine public schools recognized as Blue Ribbon schools in 2017.

School
Sea Girt Elementary School had an enrollment of 125 students in grades PreK-8 in the 2014-15 school year.
Richard Papera, Principal

Administration
Core members of the district's administration include:
Richard Papera, Superintendent
Denise Friedmann, Interim Business Administrator / Board Secretary

Board of education
The district's board of education, comprised of five members, sets policy and oversees the fiscal and educational operation of the district through its administration. As a Type II school district, the board's trustees are elected directly by voters to serve three-year terms of office on a staggered basis, with either one or two seats up for election each year held (since 2012) as part of the November general election. The board appoints a superintendent to oversee the day-to-day operation of the district.

References

External links
Sea Girt Elementary School

Data for Sea Girt Elementary School, National Center for Education Statistics

Sea Girt, New Jersey
New Jersey District Factor Group I
School districts in Monmouth County, New Jersey
Public K–8 schools in New Jersey